Narcobarbital (Pronarcon) is a barbiturate derivative developed in 1932 by Carl Heinrich Friedrich Boedecker and Heinrich Gruber Schoneberg, assignors to the firm J. D. Riedel-E. de Haën AG, Berlin, Germany. Later, in 1937, may, was patented in United States. It is an N-methylated derivative of propallylonal and has similar sedative effects. It is still used in veterinary medicine for inducing surgical anaesthesia.

References

Barbiturates
General anesthetics
Organobromides
GABAA receptor positive allosteric modulators